Caracas Libertador Simón Bolívar railway station is found in the southern part of Caracas, Venezuela, in an area known as La Rinconada.

Overview
The station is the Caracas terminus of the line Ezequiel Zamora I which connects the Tuy valley to the capital. Presently it serves as the only point of arrival or departure by train to or from Caracas. 

Those arriving from the Tuy valley can easily transfer from the railway station to La Rinconada Caracas Metro station. The train station and metro station came into service during the inaugurational runs from Caracas to the Tuy valley towns on October 15, 2006.

The short-distance trains connect the suburban towns of:
 Charallave (2 stations) 
the North one Generalísmo Francisco de Miranda 17 minutes
 the South one Don Simón Rodríguez 21 minutes 
 Cúa (1 station)
General Ezequiel Zamora Station 31 minutes

References

Railway stations in Venezuela
Buildings and structures in Caracas
Transport in Caracas
Railway stations opened in 2006
2006 establishments in Venezuela